Crime Illustrated was a black-and-white magazine published by EC Comics in late 1955 and early 1956. Part of EC's Picto-Fiction line, each magazine featured three to five stories. The format alternated panels of typography with panels of illustrations. Thus, it was arranged in tiers like a comic book but eliminated hand-lettering, balloons and panel borders.

The first issue appeared with a cover date of November–December 1955. Crime Illustrated ran for a total of two issues. The Picto-Fiction magazines lost money from the start, and when EC's distributor went bankrupt, they had no choice but to cancel them.

Writers
The editor of Crime Illustrated was Al Feldstein. As with EC's comics, Feldstein was the most prolific writer of this title, and generally wrote up to three stories per issue. In addition to stories credited to him, Feldstein also wrote using the pseudonyms Maxwell Williams and Alfred E. Neuman. In a move suggested by publisher William Gaines, Feldstein included retellings of previous stories: the first issue's "Fall Guy for Murder" and "Mother's Day", and the second issue's "Screenplay for Murder" and "Pieces of Hate". Writers included Jack Oleck (who had contributed to EC's earlier publications), Richard Smith and John Larner.

Artists
Artists featured in Crime Illustrated include Joe Orlando, Bernard Krigstein, Reed Crandall, Graham Ingels, George Evans, Jack Davis and Johnny Craig.

Reprints
Crime Illustrated was reprinted along with the other Picto-Fiction magazines in hardbound volumes by Russ Cochran (and Gemstone Publishing) in 2006 as part of his Complete EC Library. These reprints also included the first-time publication of the third issue (assembled in 1956 but never published by EC).

Issue guide

References

Defunct magazines published in the United States
EC Comics publications
Fiction magazines
Magazines established in 1955
Magazines disestablished in 1956
Quarterly magazines published in the United States
1955 establishments in New York (state)
1956 disestablishments in New York (state)
Magazines published in New York City
Magazines about comics